Streptopus is a Eurasian and North American genus of flowering plants in the lily family, found primarily in colder and temperate regions. Members of the genus are often referred to as twistedstalk. It is one of the shade-loving genera of the lily family.

Streptopus spp. are perennial herbs spreading by means of underground rhizomes. They generally produce flowers only one or two at a time, these being often small and hidden beneath the leaves and white, greenish-yellow or rose in colour.

Etymology
The genus name is a compound of the Greek adjective στρεπτός (streptos) "twisted" and the noun πούς (pous) "foot" in reference to the twisted or geniculate peduncle, as referenced in the English name given above.

Species

Streptopus amplexifolius - central + southern Europe, Russian Far East, Canada including Arctic territories, Greenland, United States (Alaska, Great Lakes + mountains)
Streptopus chatterjeeanus - Sikkim
Streptopus koreanus - Korea, China (Heilongjiang, Jilin, Liaoning)
Streptopus lanceolatus - Canada, United States (Alaska, Great Lakes, Appalachians, Cascades)
Streptopus obtusatus - China (Gansu, Hubei, Shaanxi, Sichuan, Yunnan)
Streptopus ovalis - China (Liaoning), Korea
Streptopus parasimplex - Nepal, Sikkim, Bhutan
Streptopus parviflorus - China (Sichuan, Yunnan)
Streptopus simplex - Tibet, Yunnan Bhutan, Myanmar, Nepal, Sikkim, northern + eastern India
Streptopus streptopoides - Siberia, Russian Far East, Hokkaido, Canada (Alberta, British Columbia), United States (Alaska, Washington, Oregon, northern Idaho)

References

Liliaceae
Liliaceae genera